Marvin Martins Santos da Graça (born 17 February 1995) is a Luxembourg international footballer who currently plays as defender for Austria Wien.

International career
Da Graça was born in Luxembourg and is of Cape Verdean descent. Da Graça made his first international appearance in the away match against Italy on 4 June 2014 (1–1), in which he substituted Stefano Bensi in the 79th minute.

International goals
Scores and results list Luxembourg's goal tally first.

References

1995 births
Living people
Luxembourgian footballers
Jeunesse Esch players
FC Progrès Niederkorn players
Association football defenders
FC Karpaty Lviv players
Casa Pia A.C. players
FK Austria Wien players
Ukrainian Premier League players
Liga Portugal 2 players
Austrian Football Bundesliga players
Luxembourg international footballers
Luxembourgian expatriate footballers
Expatriate footballers in Ukraine
Expatriate footballers in Portugal
Expatriate footballers in Austria
Luxembourgian expatriate sportspeople in Ukraine
Luxembourgian expatriate sportspeople in Portugal
Luxembourgian expatriate sportspeople in Austria
Luxembourgian people of Cape Verdean descent